Chief the Honourable Minister is a 1970 social novel by Nigerian writer T. M. Aluko. It was his third novel published in the influential African Writers Series after One Man, One Matchet.

References 

1970 Nigerian novels
African Writers Series